William Drew (?? – August 1637) was an English composer. Few of his compositions are known, all for viola da gamba solo, in lyra-viol style, or for  consort of viols. One of the many lyra-viol tunings takes its name from him. This suggests that he was a
lyra-violist.

Biography
Drew was one of the musicians  of the queen Henrietta Maria of France, wife of Charles I of England,  from Michaelmas 1627 until his
death in August, 1637. Then,  he was replaced by the French musician William le Grand. As most people in Henrietta Maria's entourage, he was presumably catholic. He was married to  Susan, which survived him.

Works 
His works for lyra-viol (Prelude, Almans, Corants, Sarabands etc.) are known from three manuscripts:

GB-Cu ms. Hen.Dep. 77/1 (14 pieces); GB-Ob ms.mus.sch. F.575 (6 pieces); D-Kl 4° Ms. Mus. 108, vol.7, ff. 6 and 10 (3 pieces) (violadagambanetwork).

The remaining compositions are trios for treble, tenor and bass viols (Almans, Coranto, Sarabands) from:
GB-Och Mus. 379-381, items 41-51 (11 pieces), where they are collected together with compositions by John Jenkins (composer), Charles Coleman, Simon Ives, John Cobbs and others (Christ Church Library).

Notes

References
Mattia, Kasey Marie, Crossing the channel: Cultural identity in the court entertainments of Queen Henrietta Maria, 1625–1640. Duke University ProQuest Dissertations Publishing,  2007. 3321192.

External links

1637 deaths

English male classical composers

17th-century classical composers

17th-century male musicians